Chrysothallite is a rare thallium-bearing chloride mineral with the formula K6Cu6Tl3+Cl17(OH)4•H2O. Chrysothallite is unique in being only the second mineral with essential trivalent thallium, a feature shared with natural thallium(III) oxide, avicennite. Another examples of natural thallium chlorides are steropesite, Tl3BiCl6, and lafossaite, TlCl. Chrysothallite is one of numerous fumarolic minerals discovered among fumarolic sites of the Tolbachik volcano, Kamchatka, Russia The mineral is named in allusion to its colour and thallium content.

Notes on chemistry
Chrysothallite contains a relative high amount of zinc admixture. Zinc is substituting for copper.

Association and origin
Chrysothallite may be associated with many other minerals:
 chlorides: atacamite, avdoninite, belloite,  eriochalcite, mitscherlichite, sanguite, carnallite, halite, sylvite;
 sulfates: antlerite, chlorothionite, kröhnkite, natrochalcite, gypsum, kainite

Crystal structure
The crystal structure of chrysothallite is unique. Its building elements are:
 layer of distorted CuCl4(OH)2 octahedra, in which the octahedra share edges 
 isolated Tl-centered TlCl6 octahedra
 isolated Tl-centered TlCl4(H2O)2 octahedra
 KCl6 and KCl9 polyhedra, that connect all the above elements

Origin

References

Potassium minerals
Copper(II) minerals
Thallium minerals
Tetragonal minerals
Minerals in space group 139